Radłów  (German: Radlau) is a village in Olesno County, Opole Voivodeship, in south-western Poland. It is the seat of the gmina (administrative district) called Gmina Radłów.

The village has a population of 627.

References

Villages in Olesno County